Archery at the 2015 Island Games was held from 29 June–2 July 2015 at the Jersey Rugby Club  in Saint Peter, Jersey.

Events

Medal table

Results

Men

Women

Team

References
Archery at the 2015 Island Games

2015 Island Games
2015 in archery
2015